Ibrahim Ismail may refer to:

Full name
Ibrahim Ismail (politician), Maldivian politician
Ibrahim Ismail of Johor (born 1958), Sultan of Johor
Ibrahim Ismail (general), Malaysian General, Chief of the Defence Forces (1970–77)

Given names
Ibrahim Ismail Muftah (born 1972), Qatari athlete
Ibrahim Ismail Chundrigar (1897-1960), sixth prime minister of Pakistan

Other
Ibrahim Ismail Chundrigar Road